San Sebastián Nicananduta is a town and municipality in Oaxaca in south-western Mexico. The municipality covers an area of  km2. 
It is part of the Teposcolula District in the center of the Mixteca Region

Etymology 
The word Nicananduta, comes from Mixtec Nica: "calls or gushes" and ndute: "water" and means "Place where water gushes".

History 
This town was founded approximately in the year of 1700, by function of several neighboring towns. This originated from the abundance of springs and some fruit species, such as apple, Peach, tejocote and Capulín; Likewise by the abundance of wood.

The first name of the town was in the 17th century with denomination San Sebastián del Rincón, following its course until 1780, then it was named San Sebastián de Almoloya, later in the year of 1886 was held as a municipality with the name of San Sebastian Nicananduta to the present day.

At the time of the Mexican Revolution this community was the Zapatista Army barracks and was the C. Jerónimo Orlae, Caudillo of the Agraristas as well as the C. Diódoro battle, Antirreleccionista who fought the Porfirismo and was banished, taught to read and write, the people protected him.

Since the founding of the people education was paid with different educators until the year of 1930, then began the federal primary education with the name of José María Morelos Pavón counting on the first teacher named Josefina Solis.

Notable Events

Geography

Location 
It is located in the western part of the Mixteca Region at a height of 2,360 meters above sea level.

It limits to the north with Santa Maria Chilapa de Díaz, to the west with San Antonino Monte Verde, San Juan Ñumí and San Pedro Yucuxaco to the south, to the east with San Pedro and San Pablo Teposcolula; its approximate distance to the capital of the state Oaxaca is 135 kilometers.

The total area of the municipality is 45.06 km2 and the surface of the municipality in relation to the state is 0.05%.

Towards the south of the population some quite vegetative mountainous hills are located with an altitude approximately of 3,000 meters of height on the level of the sea, towards the northwest side of the population some rather rocky hills with an altitude of approximately 2,500 msnm are located.

Nicananduta is surrounded by two mountains Cerro Ticóndo and Cerro El Tambor.

Cerro Ticóndo 
The land around Cerro Ticóndo is located mainly in the hills, but to the southwest is the mountain. The surrounding area is at an altitude of 2,989 meters and 2.8 km south of Cerro Ticóndo. Around 9 people per square kilometer around Cerro Ticóndo have a small population. The less densely populated city is San Andrés Dinicuiti, 18.1 km north of Cerro Ticóndo. Almost distributed in the vicinity of the Ticóndo hill. [4] In the region around Cerro Ticóndo, the field is very common.

Cerro El Tambor 
The terrain around Cerro El Tambor is quite typical of the countryside.  The surrounding area has an altitude of 3,046 meters and 1.1 km west of Cerro El Tambor. There are approximately 9 people per square kilometer. around Cerro El Tambor with a small population. The least populated city is San Miguel Monteverde, 13.5 km west of Cerro El Tambor. Almost covered with El Tambor hill and its surroundings. [4] In the region around Cerro El Tambor, the field is very common.

Rivers 
Towards the south side of the town several springs are located, leading 2 rivers that go to the center of the population in a north direction towards the south side of the mountains, a river is located towards the city of Tlaxiaco.

climate 
It is characterized with 3 types of cold climate of the population towards the south, temperate of the population with north direction, warm to the north of the population with direction to the town of Santo Domingo Yodohino.

Flora and Fauna 
Nicananduta includes many types of flora and fauna including Trees:  Oaks, Montezuma Pine, Madrona, Junipers, Cactus leaves, Agave Americana. Fauna including: Deer, rabbits, coyotes, foxes, birds of different species, armadillos, squirrels, among others.

Culture

Popular Festivities 
In the town an annual party is celebrated, in honor of the patron saint San Sebastián Mártir, for this reason there is a  fair on 19, 20 and 21 January.

Traditions 
Jaripeos (cowboy festivals), basketball games, fireworks, counts and coronation of the village queen and her princess, doing great dances, among other social events.

Music 
There is regional band music and conjunto (small musical group)  music.

Artisans 
In the population the weaving of the petate (mats), tenate (baskets), made by women.

Gastronomy 
The typical and traditional foods of the town are: tamales, mole, pozole, regional sauce and without missing the delicious beef broth.

Government

Main Locality 
The main town is the municipal seat.

Characterization of City Hall 

 The mayor
 A Trustee
 3 councilors (Treasury, Works, Health and Education)

Organization and Structure of the Municipal Public Administration

Functions 
Municipal President: He is in charge of managing the resources that the municipality receives, as well as coping with municipal, state and federal policies.

Municipal Trustee: He is in charge of assisting the public prosecutor in the first steps.

Treasurer: Together with the President, Trustee and Treasurer, they form the Finance Commission and are responsible for administering the municipality's resources.

Board of Education: He is in charge of educational establishments, such as kindergarten, primary and telesecundaria (High School).

Councilor of Works: In charge of public works carried out in the municipality.

Auxiliary Authorities 
Delegates of the communities

Political Regionalization 
The municipality belongs to the 3rd federal electoral district and to the 9th local electoral district.

Municipal Regulation 
The municipality has Municipal Ordinances.

Chronology of the Municipal Presidents

References

Municipalities of Oaxaca